Emmy Kaiser (born May 16, 1990) is an American wheelchair tennis player.

Biography
Kaiser was born in Cincinnati, Ohio. A graduate of St. Henry High School, she is a 2011 Parapan American Games gold medalist for doubles wheelchair tennis and silver medalist for singles. She resides at Fort Mitchell, Kentucky and is living with spina bifida. She has a bachelor's degree in psychology and attended Ball State University in Muncie, Indiana for a degree in exercise and sport psychology in which she got enrolled right after the 2012 Summer Paralympics. Her passion for such career persuasion started at the age of 14 when she met sports psychologist during a training session at the U.S. Paralympic Junior National team. Her tennis passion was inspired after she saw a tennis player named Esther Vergeer. In 2012, she was defeated by Lucy Shuker of Great Britain with 6–0, 6–2 loss in London Paralympic Games. In 2014, she lost to Jordanne Whiley with the score being 6–2 twice.

In 2016 Kaiser was named Player of the Year by the International Tennis Federation and in 2017 she was inducted into the Northern Kentucky Sports Hall of Fame.

References

External links
 
 

1990 births
Living people
American female tennis players
Wheelchair tennis players
Paralympic wheelchair tennis players of the United States
Wheelchair tennis players at the 2012 Summer Paralympics
Wheelchair tennis players at the 2016 Summer Paralympics
People with spina bifida
Ball State University alumni
Wheelchair users
Tennis players from Cincinnati
20th-century American women
21st-century American women